Getxoko Andra Mari (in Spanish Santa María de Getxo) (Our Lady of Getxo) is one of the five districts that are comprised by the municipality of Getxo, Biscay, Basque Country in the north of Spain.

It includes the historical Church of Andra Mari, before which the municipal council met historically and one exterior subway stop. It has two beaches: Azkorri and Arrigunaga, including in its extension also the cape of Punta Galea.

Geography of the Basque Country (autonomous community)